The GER Class E72 was a class of ten 0-6-0 steam locomotives designed by S. D. Holden for the Great Eastern Railway. They all passed to the London and North Eastern Railway at the 1923 grouping and received the classification J18.

History
These locomotives had  inside cylinders driving  wheels. They had a distinctive front overhang, not possessed by any other GER 0-6-0 class. This was needed to clear the cylinder tail rods. Locomotive 1240 was fitted for a time with a Weir feedwater heater and pump, with the heater component mounted on the boiler between the dome and chimney.

All were still in service at the 1923 grouping; the LNER adding 7000 to the numbers of nearly all the ex-Great Eastern locomotives, including the Class E72 locomotives. Between 1935 and 1936, the LNER rebuilt them in line with its standards, and reclassified them as class J19/2, the same as the rebuilt GER Class T77 (which had been LNER class J19, later J19/1, before rebuilding).

At nationalisation in 1948, British Railways added 60000 to their LNER numbers. They all continued in service until 1958, when the first was withdrawn; all were gone by the end of 1961.

References

External links
 — Great Eastern Railway Society
The Hill J18 & J19 (GER Classes E72 & T77) 0-6-0 Locomotives — LNER Encyclopedia

E72
0-6-0 locomotives
Railway locomotives introduced in 1912
Scrapped locomotives
Standard gauge steam locomotives of Great Britain
Freight locomotives